System magazine is a biannual publication geared toward insiders of the fashion industry. The magazine offers long-format conversations with relevant individuals within the fashion industry, accompanied by portfolios created by in-demand image-makers. System is exploring and commenting on fashion’s landscape with a focus on in-depth articles. (System was earlier the name of a successful American magazine, "the magazine of business," introduced by A.W. Shaw in 1900.)

Editorial Board 
System was founded by Alexia Niedzielski, Elizabeth von Guttman, Thomas Lenthal, and Jonathan Wingfield. The four founders are the sole members of the editorial board for the magazine. Prior to founding System, Niedzielski and von Guttman worked together as contributors at Industrie magazine. 

Jonathan Wingfield has previously been editor-in-chief of Numéro and Numéro Homme magazines for 12 years. Thomas Lenthal has been the creative director of Numéro and French Glamour.

Issues 

 System No. 1 "Back to work with Nicolas Ghesquière"
 System No. 2 "The rules are in my head - Rei Kawabuko"
 System No. 3 "Jurgen Teller - How does he do it?"
 System No. 4 "Smells like Lara", "Smells like Saskia", "Smells like Stella", "Smells like Liya"
 System No. 5 "Giorgio Armani's Staying Power"
 System No. 6 "I wanted something calm - Raf Simons"
 System No. 7 "The Happy Couple"
 System No. 8 "Everybody loves Miuccia"
 System No. 9 "Waiting for Rihanna"
 System No. 10 "What is Virgil Abloh?"
 System No. 11 "The Power of Youth"
 System No. 12 "J'adore Kim"
 System No. 13 "Angelababy wears Dior", "Fan Chengcheng wears Givenchy", "Ni Ni wears Gucci", "Saint Laurent Rive Droite"
 System No. 14 "Yohji-san "
 System No. 15 "What do we talk about? "
 System No. 16 "The new look "
 System No. 17 "Counter culture"
 System No. 18 "The Big Balenciaga Saga"
 System No. 19 "OWENSCORP"
 System No. 20 "The Saint Laurents"

References

External links 
 Official website

Magazines published in London
Fashion magazines published in the United Kingdom
Biannual magazines published in the United Kingdom
Magazines established in 2013